A perforation is a small hole in a thin material or web.

Perforation may also refer to:

A leaf feature
 Perforation (oil well), a hole punched in the casing or liner of an oil well to connect it to the reservoir
 Perforation gauge, a term used in philately
 Postage stamp perforation, used to separate postage stamps
 Film perforations, the holes placed in the film stock during manufacturing and used for transporting
 Hair perforation test, a laboratory test used to help distinguish the isolates of dermatophytes
 Hydro-slotted perforation, a process in oil and gas drilling
 Organ perforation, a complete penetration of the wall of a hollow organ in the body, including:
 Corneal perforation
 Eardrum perforation
 Esophageal perforation
 Gastrointestinal perforation
 Nasal septum perforation
 Stercoral perforation
 Uterine perforation